is a Japanese former football player.

Playing career
Irii was born in Ibaraki Prefecture on October 18, 1970. After graduating from high school, he joined Honda in 1989. He played often in 1991. He moved to Kashima Antlers in 1992. However he did not play as much. He moved to the newly promoted J1 League club, Kashiwa Reysol in 1995. However he still did not play much and he moved to the Japan Football League club Brummell Sendai in 1996. He retired at the end of the 1997 season.

Club statistics

References

External links

awx.jp

1970 births
Living people
Association football people from Ibaraki Prefecture
Japanese footballers
Japan Soccer League players
J1 League players
Japan Football League (1992–1998) players
Honda FC players
Kashima Antlers players
Kashiwa Reysol players
Vegalta Sendai players
Association football defenders